Patrick Ronald Rembert (born April 9, 1990) is an American professional basketball player for Haia Al Qana of the Egyptian Basketball Super League. He played college basketball at UC Irvine from 2007 to 2011.

College career
After graduating, on August 7, 2011, Rembert signed with Šentjur of Premier A Slovenian Basketball League. As a senior at UC Irvine in 2011-12 Rembert averaged 12.2 points, 3.3 rebounds and 3.3 assists in 33.1 minutes in 32 appearances.

Professional career
On December 12, 2017, Rebert scored 45 points in a 110-93 away lose with Tadamon Zouk against Louaize Club. On August 4, 2018, he signed with Lukoil Levski.

Rembert played three games for Fethiye Belediyespor of the Turkish league in 2021. On January 11, 2022, he signed with  Haia Al Qana of the Egyptian Basketball Super League.

References

External links
Eurobasket.com Profile
RealGM Profile

1989 births
Living people
American expatriate basketball people in Bosnia and Herzegovina
American expatriate basketball people in Bulgaria
American expatriate basketball people in Croatia
American expatriate basketball people in the Dominican Republic
American expatriate basketball people in Egypt
American expatriate basketball people in Lebanon
American expatriate basketball people in Saudi Arabia
American expatriate basketball people in Serbia
American expatriate basketball people in Slovenia
American expatriate basketball people in Turkey
American expatriate basketball people in Venezuela
American men's basketball players
Basketball League of Serbia players
Basketball players from Long Beach, California
BC Levski Sofia players
Guards (basketball)
HKK Široki players
KK Šentjur players
OKK Novi Pazar players
Petkim Spor players
Trotamundos B.B.C. players
UC Irvine Anteaters men's basketball players